The 2018–19 UEFA Champions League qualifying phase and play-off round began on 26 June and ended on 29 August 2018.

A total of 53 teams competed in the qualifying system of the 2018–19 UEFA Champions League, which includes the qualifying phase and the play-off round, with 43 teams in Champions Path and 10 teams in League Path. The six winners in the play-off round (four from Champions Path, two from League Path) advanced to the group stage, to join the 26 teams that entered in the group stage.

Times are CEST (UTC+2), as listed by UEFA (local times, if different, are in parentheses).

Teams

Champions Path
The Champions Path includes all league champions which do not qualify directly for the group stage, and consists of the following rounds:
Preliminary round (4 teams playing one-legged semi-finals and final): 4 teams which enter in this round.
First qualifying round (32 teams): 31 teams which enter in this round, and 1 winner of the preliminary round.
Second qualifying round (20 teams): 4 teams which enter in this round, and 16 winners of the first qualifying round.
Third qualifying round (12 teams): 2 teams which enter in this round, and 10 winners of the second qualifying round.
Play-off round (8 teams): 2 teams which enter in this round, and 6 winners of the third qualifying round.

All teams eliminated from the Champions Path enter the Europa League:
The 3 losers of the preliminary round and 15 of the 16 losers of the first qualifying round (excluding 1 team which receives a bye to the third qualifying round as decided by an additional draw held after the Champions League first qualifying round draw) enter the Champions Path second qualifying round.
The loser of the first qualifying round which receives a bye and the 10 losers of the second qualifying round enter the Champions Path third qualifying round.
The 6 losers of the third qualifying round enter the Champions Path play-off round.
The 4 losers of the play-off round enter the group stage.

Below are the participating teams of the Champions Path (with their 2018 UEFA club coefficients), grouped by their starting rounds.

League Path
The League Path includes all league non-champions which do not qualify directly for the group stage, and consists of the following rounds:
Second qualifying round (4 teams): 4 teams which enter in this round.
Third qualifying round (8 teams): 6 teams which enter in this round, and 2 winners of the second qualifying round.
Play-off round (4 teams): 4 winners of the third qualifying round.

All teams eliminated from the League Path enter the Europa League:
The 2 losers of the second qualifying round enter the Main Path third qualifying round.
The 4 losers of the third qualifying round and the 2 losers of the play-off round enter the group stage.

Below are the participating teams of the League Path (with their 2018 UEFA club coefficients), grouped by their starting rounds.

Format
Each tie, apart from the preliminary round, is played over two legs, with each team playing one leg at home. The team that scores more goals on aggregate over the two legs advance to the next round. If the aggregate score is level, the away goals rule is applied, i.e. the team that scores more goals away from home over the two legs advances. If away goals are also equal, then extra time is played. The away goals rule is again applied after extra time, i.e. if there are goals scored during extra time and the aggregate score is still level, the visiting team advances by virtue of more away goals scored. If no goals are scored during extra time, the tie is decided by penalty shoot-out. In the preliminary round, where single-match semi-finals and final are hosted by one of the participating teams, if scores are level at the end of normal time, extra time is played, followed by penalty shoot-out if scores remain tied.

In the draws for each round, teams are seeded based on their UEFA club coefficients at the beginning of the season, with the teams divided into seeded and unseeded pots containing the same number of teams. A seeded team is drawn against an unseeded team, with the order of legs (or the administrative "home" team in the preliminary round matches) in each tie decided by draw. As the identity of the winners of the previous round is not known at the time of the draws, the seeding is carried out under the assumption that the team with the higher coefficient of an undecided tie advances to this round, which means if the team with the lower coefficient is to advance, it simply take the seeding of its opponent. Prior to the draws, UEFA may form "groups" in accordance with the principles set by the Club Competitions Committee, but they are purely for convenience of the draw and do not resemble any real groupings in the sense of the competition. Teams from associations with political conflicts as decided by UEFA may not be drawn into the same tie. After the draws, the order of legs of a tie may be reversed by UEFA due to scheduling or venue conflicts.

Schedule
The schedule is as follows (all draws are held at the UEFA headquarters in Nyon, Switzerland).

Preliminary round
The draw for the preliminary round was held on 12 June 2018, 12:00 CEST, to determine the matchups of the semi-finals and the administrative "home" team of each semi-final and final.

Seeding
A total of four teams were involved in the preliminary round draw. Two teams were seeded and two teams were unseeded for the semi-final round draw.

Bracket

Summary
The semi-final round was played on 26 June, and the final round on 29 June 2018, both at the Victoria Stadium in Gibraltar.

|+Semi-final round

|}

|+Final round

|}

Semi-final round

Final round

First qualifying round
The draw for the first qualifying round was held on 19 June 2018, 12:00 CEST.

Seeding
A total of 32 teams were involved in the first qualifying round draw: 31 teams entering in this round, and the winners of the preliminary round. They were divided into three groups: two of ten teams, where five teams were seeded and five teams were unseeded, and one of twelve teams, where six teams were seeded and six teams were unseeded.

Notes

Summary

The first legs were played on 10 and 11 July, and the second legs on 17 and 18 July 2018.

|}
Notes

Matches

Sheriff Tiraspol won 4–2 on aggregate.

Shkëndija won 5–4 on aggregate.

Sūduva Marijampolė won 3–2 on aggregate.

Qarabağ won 1–0 on aggregate.

Vidi won 3–2 on aggregate.

Malmö FF won 5–0 on aggregate.

HJK won 5–2 on aggregate.

Ludogorets Razgrad won 9–0 on aggregate.

Legia Warsaw won 4–0 on aggregate.

Rosenborg won 3–2 on aggregate.

1–1 on aggregate. Kukësi won on away goals.

Hapoel Be'er Sheva won 7–2 on aggregate.

Red Star Belgrade won 2–0 on aggregate.

Celtic won 6–0 on aggregate.

Spartak Trnava won 2–1 on aggregate.

Astana won 3–0 on aggregate.

Second qualifying round
The draw for the second qualifying round was held on 19 June 2018, 14:00 CEST.

Seeding
A total of 24 teams were involved in the second qualifying round draw.
Champions Path: four teams entering in this round, and the 16 winners of the first qualifying round. They were divided into two groups of ten teams, where five teams were seeded and five teams were unseeded.
League Path: four teams entering in this round. Two teams were seeded and two teams were unseeded.

Notes

Summary
The first legs were played on 24 and 25 July, and the second legs on 31 July and 1 August 2018.

|+Champions Path

|}

|+League Path

|}

Champions Path

Astana won 2–1 on aggregate.

Vidi won 1–0 on aggregate.

Qarabağ won 3–0 on aggregate.

Malmö FF won 2–1 on aggregate.

Dinamo Zagreb won 7–2 on aggregate.

Red Star Belgrade won 5–0 on aggregate.

BATE Borisov won 2–1 on aggregate.

Shkëndija won 1–0 on aggregate.

Spartak Trnava won 2–1 on aggregate.

Celtic won 3–1 on aggregate.

League Path

PAOK won 5–1 on aggregate.

Ajax won 5–1 on aggregate.

Third qualifying round
The draw for the third qualifying round was held on 23 July 2018, 12:00 CEST.

Seeding
A total of 20 teams were involved in the third qualifying round draw.
Champions Path: two teams entering in this round, and the 10 winners of the second qualifying round Champions Path. Six teams were seeded and six teams were unseeded.
League Path: six teams entering in this round, and the two winners of the second qualifying round League Path. Four teams were seeded and four teams were unseeded. Teams from Ukraine and Russia could not be drawn into the same tie, and if such a pairing was drawn or was set to be drawn in the final tie, the second team drawn in the current tie would be moved to the next tie.

Notes

Summary
The first legs were played on 7 and 8 August, and the second legs on 14 August 2018.

|+Champions Path

|}

|+League Path

|}

Champions Path

AEK Athens won 3–2 on aggregate.

Red Bull Salzburg won 4–0 on aggregate.

Red Star Belgrade won 3–2 on aggregate.

BATE Borisov won 2–1 on aggregate.

Dinamo Zagreb won 3–0 on aggregate.

1–1 on aggregate. Vidi won on away goals.

League Path

Ajax won 5–2 on aggregate.

Benfica won 2–1 on aggregate.

Dynamo Kyiv won 3–1 on aggregate.

PAOK won 3–2 on aggregate.

Play-off round
The draw for the play-off round was held on 6 August 2018, 12:00 CEST.

Seeding
A total of 12 teams were involved in the play-off round draw.
Champions Path: two teams entering in this round, and the six winners of the third qualifying round Champions Path. Four teams were seeded and four teams were unseeded.
League Path: the four winners of the third qualifying round League Path. Two teams were seeded and two teams were unseeded. Teams from Ukraine and Russia could not be drawn into the same tie, and to prevent such a potential pairing, the four teams were divided into two pairings prior to the draw.

Notes

Summary
The first legs were played on 21 and 22 August, and the second legs on 28 and 29 August 2018.

|+Champions Path

|}

|+League Path

|}

Champions Path

2–2 on aggregate. Red Star Belgrade won on away goals.

PSV Eindhoven won 6–2 on aggregate.

Young Boys won 3–2 on aggregate.

AEK Athens won 3–2 on aggregate.

League Path

Benfica won 5–2 on aggregate.

Ajax won 3–1 on aggregate.

Top goalscorers
There were 211 goals scored in 91 matches in the qualifying phase and play-off round, for an average of  goals per match.

Source:

Notes

References

External links

Qualifying Rounds
2018-19
June 2018 sports events in Europe
July 2018 sports events in Europe
August 2018 sports events in Europe